From his real name Djamel Fezari, Kore is a French DJ, producer, composer and entrepreneur. He started out as a DJ when hip-hop arrived in France in the late 1990s. His first big success was to produce « TDSI» by Rohff. He will confirm his talent by participating in Booba's classic albums « Panthéon » and « Ouest Side». He will then work with the most influential artists of the time such as Kery James, Mac Tyer, la Sexion D’assaut..

His career will take on a whole new dimension thanks to his work of fusion between Raï and RnB with the « Raï’n’B Fever » project in the 2000s. He is at the origin of big hits like « un Gaou à Oran » by Magic System with the 113 or even « Sobri » by Leslie featuring Amine. He will release no less than 4 volumes on this concept.

Always influenced by American hip hop culture, he will be exported in 2010 to the USA by placing on the Mayback Music, label of Rick Ross. He will produce for artists such as French Montana, Kid Cudi, Wale, Lil Durk  and in a more popular style with avec Will I Am, Kelly Rowland, Amerie or Shaggy. 

He will support his status as a precursor in French rap a few years later by launching SCH's career with the « A7 » project and the legendary titles « Gomorra » or « Champs Elysées » . He will also produce on his first double platinum album « Anarchie » with in particular « Je la connais », « Anarchie » and  « 6.47i » certified platinum singles. He will also propel  Lacrim’s career with his album « Corleone », number 1 in France and Belgium, his international hit « AWA » feat. French Montana and his mixtapes « R.I.P.R.O » Vol.1 and Vol.2 both certified platinum. He then collaborated with Alonzo, Niska, Rim’K, Kool Shen, Seth Gueko, Lefa,Mister You, Sadek, L’algerino, Dosseh, Gradur, etc...

At the same time, he marked the electronic scene by producing Brodinski's albums such as « Brava »  and « Discipline »  by Club Cheval. His latest success in the genre remains  « The Sun » by Myd. His openness also led him to work in the film industry on soundtracks for films such as : « Taxi 3 » , « Taxi 5 », « Cliente », « Pattaya » and « En passant pécho ». « Taxi 3 » and « Taxi 5 », « Cliente », « Pattaya » and « Passing by pécho ». He will also be asked on the films:  « Pourquoi j’ai pas mangé mon père » and « La marche ». 

He remains today with his label AWA (Arab With Attitude), one of the major actors of the French urban scene by placing on the works of Ninho, Dadju, S.Pri Noir, Kekra, Djadja & Dinaz, Vegedream and by producing artists like Luv Resval, Diddi Trix, Nahir or even Zola  with  « Amber » gold single and number 1 of the top single since November 2022.

Discography

Certified albums

Certified singles 

Find more about Kore's discography on Genius.

References

French record producers
French people of Algerian descent
Living people
Year of birth missing (living people)
French hip hop record producers